European route E68 forms part of the United Nations International E-road network, linking Hungary with Romania. It starts in Szeged, Hungary, and ends in Braşov, Romania.

Its route is: Szeged – Makó – Nădlac – Pecica – Arad – Lipova – Deva – Simeria – Orăştie – Sebeş – Sibiu – Șelimbăr – Făgăraş – Braşov.

Itinerary 

: Szeged – Makó – Csanádpalota

: Nădlac
: Nădlac
: Veștem – Făgăraş – Braşov

References 

ADAC-Straßenatlas Ost-Europa, ADAC e.V., München, 1993

External links 
 UN Economic Commission for Europe: Overall Map of E-road Network (2007)

68
E068
E068